The Dawson College shooting occurred on September 13, 2006, at Dawson College, a CEGEP located in  downtown Montreal, Quebec, Canada. The perpetrator, Kimveer Singh Gill, began shooting outside the de Maisonneuve Boulevard entrance to the school, and moved towards the atrium by the cafeteria on the main floor. One victim died at the scene, while another 19 were injured, eight of whom were listed in critical condition, with six requiring surgery. The shooter later committed suicide, after being shot in the arm by a police officer. It was the third fatal school shooting in Montreal, after the École Polytechnique massacre in 1989 and the shooting spree at Concordia University in 1992.

Shooting 

At 12:30 p.m. EDT, Gill parked his car on de Maisonneuve Boulevard near the college campus and was seen removing weapons from his trunk by bystanders. Gill briefly took a passerby hostage and forced him to carry a bag containing a fourth gun and additional ammunition. Gill opened fire at students outside on the steps of Dawson College at its rear entrance with a semi-automatic carbine, and the passerby fled the melee, leaving Gill's bag.

Gill then entered the school and made his way to the cafeteria, almost directly ahead of the school entrance. He positioned himself in the corner of the building, near the microwave oven, and set his bag on the floor. He loaded a pistol, fired a shot into the floor and then shot students who were standing in front of him. He then raised his weapon and ordered the remaining students to lie down on the floor. He continued shooting at students until confronted by two police officers who had been visiting the school at the time regarding an unrelated incident. The police officers entered after hearing the gunfire, and rushed to the cafeteria. Additional police officers surrounded the campus. Confronted by police officers in the school cafeteria, Gill briefly took two more people hostage.

He was shot in the arm by police officer Denis Côté and then committed suicide via a gunshot wound to the head at 12:48 EDT. The police officers attempted to resuscitate him, but failed. At 1:30 p.m., police officers dragged his body outside the building, covered it with a yellow bag, then continued the evacuation and the search for possible accomplices.  Authorities concluded the attack was premeditated, after a short suicide note was found on Gill's body during the autopsy.

The television network TVA reported that security camera footage from Place Alexis Nihon showed Gill staking out the area as far back as August 10, more than a month before the shootings.

Victims
The police confirmed the death of one victim, an 18-year-old woman who was shot in the abdomen and died on the scene. Canadian newspapers later identified the woman as Anastasia Rebecca De Sousa.

The Montreal Police Service later reported that 19 other people had been wounded. One victim, who was reportedly at Dawson College to visit friends, suffered two shots to the head. He underwent intensive surgery; the doctors removed one bullet, and he remained in a coma for one week after the shooting as doctors determined whether they should try to remove the second bullet.

Investigation 
Police initially looked for as many as three suspects, but Montreal Police Chief Yvan Delorme later confirmed that there was only one shooter, who shot himself fatally on the scene. Many eyewitnesses described a man with a Mohawk hairstyle, wearing a black trenchcoat, black trousers with metal studs, and combat boots. The suspect carried three weapons, including a semi-automatic carbine.
That evening, a Sûreté du Québec spokesperson confirmed to LCN TV reporters that the shooter was a 25-year-old male, born in Québec. Police found his car, a black Pontiac Sunfire, parked close to the school, and later searched the house where he lived with his mother, seizing a computer and other belongings.

Around midnight on Wednesday, police confirmed to the media that the suspect was Kimveer Gill, a 25-year-old Laval resident, a graduate from Rosemere High School. An autopsy later revealed that Gill committed suicide after being hit in the arm by police officer Denis Côté's gunfire. It was revealed that Gill's actions were premeditated; a short suicide note was found on Gill's body.

During a police search at Gill's home, an apology note to his family was found. In addition, police seized firearm accessories including holsters and manuals, including those of the firearm he used during attack; they also found a letter praising the actions of Columbine shooters Eric Harris and Dylan Klebold.

Aftermath 

Police cordoned off the campus area and swept the school for students left inside. Local radio reports placed the number of police vehicles at approximately 80 and up to 24 ambulances surrounded the building. Students and faculty were evacuated from the campus or left the vicinity of the shooting.

Two shopping centres adjacent to Dawson, Place Alexis Nihon and Westmount Square, directly linked to the Atwater metro station, were evacuated and the green line of the Montreal Metro was shut down for several hours between Lionel-Groulx and McGill. The Pepsi Forum entertainment centre, opposite the eastern corner of Dawson, was open when many of the students came running into the premises moments after the shooting began. Shortly afterward, the Pepsi Forum went into lockdown under the directives of the Montreal Police. Eventually, one of the Forum's entrances onto St. Catherine Street re-opened under police/security guard to allow monitored access and egress.

A large number of the evacuees were also directed to the nearby Concordia University, where the Concordia Student Union (CSU) is located. The CSU cancelled all remaining Orientation activities, and instead used its venues to temporarily shelter the evacuated Dawson students and provide them with food, water, blankets, and phones to reach other loved ones. A coordination team was put in place from the CSU, and the DSU used the Sir George Williams campus as a temporary crisis centre and offered counselling (psychologist, psychiatrist) to traumatized students and staff. Claude Dauphin (Mayor of the borough of Lachine and Vice-President of the City of Montreal executive committee) had a very close relationship with both of the student unions during the night of the events; Dauphin went to the CSU office's the night of the shooting to meet with both unions to inform them of what the city was doing, and to ask how he could help.

The police also established several phone numbers for parents and friends of the students.

Police reported that they needed a few days to process the crime scene. As a result, officials from Dawson College stated that the school would be closed until Monday, September 18, 2006, scheduled to open its doors at 11:00 a.m. and remain open until 7:00 p.m. and have an "Open House" feel to the day. Classes were scheduled to resume as usual on Tuesday, September 19, 2006.

A follow-up study conducted by the McGill University Health Centre Research Institute found that 30% of Dawson students at the time of the shooting suffered mental health consequences including post-traumatic stress disorder, major depression, alcohol dependence, and social phobia, a level twice that found in the general population. Approximately 18% of respondents developed a mental health disorder despite never having had one before.

Perpetrator
Kimveer Gill was a 25-year-old Canadian born on 9 July 1981 in Lachine, Quebec, Canada. His parents were of Punjabi descent, and moved to Saint-Laurent, Quebec from India in early 1981.  The family later settled in the Fabreville area of Laval, Quebec in 1987. Kimveer attended Twin Oaks Elementary School in Laval from 1988 to 1993.

Gill later attended Rosemere High School, where he was remembered by teachers as quiet and unassuming. Despite early media reports, he performed well academically, and most students remember him as having friends and certainly never being bullied. Kimveer graduated from Rosemere High School in June 1998. He enrolled in Vanier College with his friends Steven Kulczycki, Andrew Page, and Jason Rust. However, he dropped out in January 1999.

Gill briefly received military training from the Canadian Forces Leadership and Recruit School in Saint-Jean-sur-Richelieu, Quebec, from January 17 to February 16, 1999. He had told his friends he wished to eventually become a mercenary. He did not complete his basic training for unknown reasons.  He was deemed unsuitable for military service and was voluntarily discharged before receiving extensive weapons training. Gill was a member of a rifle club and visited the Ville Saint-Pierre facility the day prior to the shooting.

The killer's profile was discovered on a website called VampireFreaks under the screen name "fatality666."  The last login was at 10:35 a.m. on the day of the shooting. The profile was subsequently restricted to registered users, and then removed entirely.

Firearms
Gill was armed with a Beretta Cx4 Storm pistol-caliber carbine, a Glock pistol (reports are conflicting as to whether this was chambered in 9mm or .45 ACP), and a shotgun. He fired sixty shots, ten of which were fired outside the school. With the exception of five shots from his pistol, including the one to kill himself, all the shots came from the rifle.

There were reports of an additional firearm in a bag that he forced a hostage to bring along as he arrived near the campus site. According to TVA's crime reporter Claude Poirier, Gill briefly held a lawyer hostage and demanded that he bring the bag containing the fourth gun and additional ammunition. When the first shots were fired and police arrived, the lawyer fled the scene and hid Gill's bag.

Gill had a restricted firearm license. His firearms were registered with the Canadian gun registry. The transportation, storage, and use of his firearms in the incident were not legal as per firearms regulation in Canada, despite the acquisition and possession being legal.

Response

Students and faculty 
Some student leaders criticized the immediate response of the Dawson College administration. The Chronicle of Higher Education reported that "if it hadn't been for help from the Student Union at nearby Concordia University... many of the Dawson students would have had no one to turn to for help." 

Dawson's director-general Richard Filion called the student charges harsh.
"We did our best to evacuate the building. We were in a state of shock. We were scattered everywhere around the city," Filion said, noting many staff members were out on lunch break.
Dawson does have an emergency plan, he said, but it was designed with fire safety in mind.

Filion announced that staff and faculty would return to the College on Friday, September 15, and that classes would resume on Tuesday, September 19, 2006. The school invited all students to join them on Monday, September 18, 2006 to meet with staff and faculty for information and support, as well as to retrieve belongings that had been left behind. It was announced that grief counseling and support services would be available on an ongoing basis.

In addition, one of the victims, 18-year-old Hayder Kadhim, who received two bullet wounds to the head and neck, challenged Prime Minister Stephen Harper to a gun control debate in a public speech on CBC in response to the shooting.

Politicians 
 Canadian Prime Minister Stephen Harper stated the shootings were "...a cowardly and senseless act of violence..."
 Interim Liberal Party leader Bill Graham and Member of Parliament (MP) Lucienne Robillard: "We must act as a country to show our compassion for those whose lives have been dramatically altered by this inexplicable event."
 Bloc Québécois Leader Gilles Duceppe: "It's tragic. We can never explain why these things happen. At the Polytechnique women were targeted. But here, we have no idea." Duceppe also suggested the need for a national gun registry.
 New Democratic Party Leader Jack Layton mentioned that it "was a grim reminder of previous school shootings" and that it hit particularly close to home for him; Layton was born and raised in a suburb of Montreal and attended McGill University, a short distance from Dawson College.
 Quebec Premier Jean Charest stated "We are deeply saddened for the victims, the families, the parents of the children who study at Dawson."
Montreal Mayor Gérald Tremblay stated "This is so tragic. How do we talk to the parents who are going through this? All I can say is that I feel for them, and I care for them."

Video gaming community 
 Danny Ledonne, creator of Super Columbine Massacre RPG!, expressed his sorrow at the shootings, asked members of his web site to "... be aware of the sensitive nature of Montreal right now and of those who were affected by this shooting," and explained how his game is not designed to train shooters.
 Ian Bogost of Water Cooler Games says "A tragedy like this saddens and disturbs us all... Gill was a disturbed man [...] he clearly needed help he did not get."

Complaints about media coverage 
Monique Lépine (mother of Marc Lépine, the perpetrator of the École Polytechnique massacre) spoke out in wake of the shooting, the first time she had ever done so since her son's massacre 16 years prior.

Jan Wong controversy 

An immediate controversy arose about an article regarding the Dawson shootings by journalist Jan Wong, of the Toronto-based The Globe and Mail. Three days after the event, Wong, who was born and raised in Montreal and is the daughter of Chinese immigrants, wrote a front-page piece titled Get under the desk, in which she drew a link between all three school shootings in Quebec history (the École Polytechnique, the Concordia University and the Dawson College killings) and the nature of Quebec society under its protective language laws.

Wong suggested the fact that the three perpetrators were not old-stock French Quebecers (the shooters were Algerian, Belarusian, and Punjabi in descent) was related to their murderous actions since, she claimed, they were alienated from a Quebec society concerned with "racial purity." Accused of "Quebec bashing," Wong's writing soon created public outcry in Quebec and political condemnation. Quebec Premier Jean Charest called the article a "disgrace", stating that it "betrays an ignorance of Canadian values and a profound misunderstanding of Québec." On September 20, 2006, Prime Minister Stephen Harper pronounced it "prejudiced, absurd, irresponsible and without foundation"; the same day, the House of Commons of Canada unanimously passed a motion requesting an apology for the column.

Wong's writing followed the comments of Professor Elliott Leyton, a social-anthropologist who is a widely consulted expert on serial homicide.
Interviewed by CBC Newsworld on September 14, 2006 about the Dawson College shooting, Leyton stated that because all three such murderous rampages in Quebec involved a killer who was either an immigrant or a child of immigrants, it warranted an examination of government and societal attitudes.

Broadcast Code violation 
In 2007, the Canadian Broadcast Standards Council faulted CKNW, a radio station in Vancouver, British Columbia for airing "potentially dangerous information" during the Dawson College shooting. During the incident, CKNW had simulcast content from its sister stations in Montreal which included students speaking by cellphone from inside the school. A Vancouver man complained that the content could have told the gunman where the students were. The council said that as a result of modern technology reducing geographic distance as a barrier, CKNW had breached Section 10 (coverage of violent situations) of the broadcast code. The station broadcast the decision as required, but did not air an apology.

Megadeth
Gill mentioned the song "A Tout le Monde" by the thrash metal band Megadeth on his blog on VampireFreaks.com on the day of the shooting. Megadeth was blamed for the shooting by many news outlets and watchdog groups as a result.

Later in 2006, Megadeth performed live in Montreal, and responded to the blame that had been placed on the band and their music as a result. Band leader Dave Mustaine told the crowd:

The guy who went to Dawson College and shot everyone, it's terrible. Aside from the fact that what he did was wrong, we have a relationship with Montreal, and that really pissed us off.

Before the concert in an interview for CBC News Mustaine said:

I was so angry that this guy would use my song, and that he would try and turn that beautiful song into something ugly and nasty. It's for those who lost their lives, and it's a gift to those who are in the process of healing (...) and Gill was not worthy of being a Megadeth fan.

Natural Born Killers

This is the ninth mass killing to implicate the movie Natural Born Killers, per the gunman's blog at vampirefreaks.com, which he called one of his favourites. At some point prior to September 20, 2006, the blog was deleted.

References

External links

Montreal Police Press Release
Metroblogging Montreal: First hand account Wed, 13 September 2006 17:31:00 EST
Newswire CNW: Dawson Student Union Press Release, Sept 14, 2006
Reconstructing The Dawson College Shooting Moment By Moment – Part 1
Reconstructing The Dawson College Shooting Moment By Moment – Part 2
Dawson Shooting Dossier – Radio-Canada (French)
Cell Phone Video Of Dawson College Shooting

2000s in Montreal
2006 in Quebec
2006 mass shootings in Canada
2006 murders in Canada
Crime in Montreal
Crimes involving Satanism or the occult
Dawson College
 
Mass shootings in Canada
Murder in Quebec
Murder–suicides in Canada
School killings in Canada
School shootings in Canada
September 2006 crimes
September 2006 events in Canada
Spree shootings in Canada
University and college killings
University and college shootings
2006 disasters in Canada
Columbine High School massacre copycat crimes
Attacks in Canada in 2006